The  Helmet of Peretu  is a Geto-Dacian silver helmet dating from the 4th century BC, housed in the National Museum of Romanian History, Bucharest. It  comes from Peretu area, in the  Teleorman County, Romania. There were 50 artifacts having 750g. The helmet is similar to the Helmet of Coţofeneşti and other three Getian gold or silver helmets discovered so far.

See also 

 Getae

References

Military history of Dacia
Archaeological discoveries in Romania
Dacian culture
Ancient helmets
Thracian archaeological artifacts
5th century BC in Romania
Individual helmets